Events from the year 1678 in Ireland.

Incumbent
Monarch: Charles II

Events
October 11 – Peter Talbot, Roman Catholic Archbishop of Dublin and Primate of Ireland, having returned to Ireland in May, is arrested near Maynooth on the orders of James Butler, Duke of Ormonde, Lord Lieutenant of Ireland, for supposed complicity in the Popish Plot and imprisoned in Dublin Castle.
The vacant Bishopric of Leighlin is given to the Bishop of Kildare to form the Roman Catholic Diocese of Kildare and Leighlin.

Births
September 26 – Peter Lacy, soldier, imperial commander in Russia (d.1751)
1677 or 1678 – George Farquhar, dramatist (d.1707)

Deaths
August 23 – Nicholas French, Bishop of Ferns, political activist and pamphleteer (b.1604)

References

 
1670s in Ireland
Ireland
Years of the 17th century in Ireland